Kingsweston School is a school for children with moderate to severe learning difficulties and is located in an old manor near Lawrence Weston, in the City/County of Bristol. It is a rapidly expanding school, with four sites and caters to a wide range of pupils in both terms of age (pre-school to post-16) and ability. It has a well-established autistic provision and is keen on strengthening the links with the wider community it already enjoys.

In 2014 Ofsted rated the school as Good.

References

External links

Special schools in Bristol
Community schools in Bristol